Joe Duddell (born 26 July 1972) is a composer, musician and conductor from Manchester, UK, and former Associate Professor of Music in the School of Music and Performing Arts of Bath Spa University.  He worked with British indie rock groups James, Elbow and Daughter.  he is senior professional tutor in music composition at Liverpool Hope University and teaches at the LIPA.

Duddell studied music at the University of Salford and the Royal Academy of Music, and has held academic posts at Exeter University, Brunel University and Salford University before taking up his post at Bath Spa in September 2012.

He was composer-in-residence at the annual Festival N°6 held in Portmerion, Wales, which ceased after the 2018 event.

References

External links

1972 births
Living people
Alumni of the University of Salford
Alumni of the Royal Academy of Music
Academics of Bath Spa University
Academics of the University of Salford
Academics of the University of Exeter
Academics of Brunel University London
British composers
British male conductors (music)
21st-century British conductors (music)
21st-century British male musicians